The 2022–23 season is the 109th in the history of SC Austria Lustenau and their first season back in the top flight since 2000. The club will participate in Austrian Football Bundesliga and Austrian Cup.

Players 
Updated 1 July 2022.

Transfers

Pre-season and friendlies

Competitions

Overall record

Austrian Football Bundesliga

League table

Results summary

Results by round

Matches 
The league fixtures were announced on 22 June 2022.

Austrian Cup

References

SC Austria Lustenau
Austria Lustenau